Markethill Swifts Football Club is an intermediate-level football club playing in the Intermediate B division of the Mid-Ulster Football League in Northern Ireland. The club is based in Markethill, County Armagh. Manager Phil "Pep" Mccomb has overseen a fantastic 2019–2020 season, putting Markethill back on the map.

References

External links
 Daily Mirror Mid-Ulster Football League Official website
 nifootball.co.uk - (For fixtures, results and tables of all Northern Ireland amateur football leagues)

Association football clubs in Northern Ireland
Association football clubs in County Armagh
Mid-Ulster Football League clubs
1989 establishments in Northern Ireland
Association football clubs established in 1989